Macbeth is a 1982 Hungarian television film adapted, edited and directed by Béla Tarr. György Cserhalmi stars Macbeth while Erzsébet Kútvölgyi portrays Lady Macbeth. The film is composed of only two shots: The first (before the main title) is five minutes long, the second 57 minutes long.

Considered to be a watershed in the filmmaker's artistic development, the film was among examples of Tarr's work screened at the Museum of Modern Art during a retrospective in October 2001. It has also been screened during a retrospective at the 33rd Moscow International Film Festival.

References

Bibliography

External links 

1980s biographical drama films
1980s historical drama films
1980s avant-garde and experimental films
1983 independent films
1983 films
Films based on Macbeth
Films directed by Béla Tarr
Films shot in Hungary
Hungarian biographical drama films
Hungarian historical drama films
Hungarian independent films
1980s Hungarian-language films
Hungarian television films
Television shows based on plays
1983 drama films
One-shot films